Arcadia is a region in the central Peloponnese. It takes its name from the mythological character Arcas, and in Greek mythology it was the home of the gods Hermes and Pan. In European Renaissance arts, Arcadia was celebrated as an unspoiled, harmonious wilderness; as such, it was referenced in popular culture.

The modern regional unit of the same name more or less overlaps with the historical region, but is slightly larger.

History

Arcadia was gradually linked in a loose confederation that included all the Arcadian towns and was named League of the Arcadians. In the 7th century BC, it successfully faced the threat of Sparta and the Arcadians managed to maintain their independence. They participated in the Persian Wars alongside other Greeks by sending forces to Thermopylae and Plataea. During the Peloponnesian War, Arcadia allied with Sparta and Corinth. In the following years, during the period of the Hegemony of Thebes, the Theban general Epaminondas reinforced the Arcadian federation in order to form a rival pole to the neighboring Sparta. Then he founded Megalopolis, which became its new capital. Over the next centuries Arcadia weakened. It initially was subjugated by the Macedonians and later the Arcadians joined the Achaean League.

Geography

Geographically, ancient Arcadia occupied the highlands at the centre of the Peloponnese. To the north, it bordered Achaea along the ridge of high ground running from Mount Erymanthos to Mount Cyllene; most of Mount Aroania lay within Arcadia. To the east, it had borders with Argolis and Corinthia along the ridge of high ground running from Mount Cyllene round to Mount Oligyrtus and then south Mount Parthenius. To the south, the borders with Laconia and Messenia ran through the foothills of the Parnon and Taygetos mountain ranges, such that Arcadia contained all the headwaters of the Alpheios river, but none of the Eurotas river. To the south-west, the border with Messania ran along the tops of Mount Nomia, and Mount Elaeum, and from there the border with Elis ran along the valleys of the Erymanthos and Diagon rivers. Most of the region of Arcardia was mountainous, apart from the plains around Tegea and Megalopolis, and the valleys of the Alpheios and Ladon rivers.

Arcadians

The Arcadians were an ancient Greek tribe which was situated in the mountainous Peloponnese. It is considered one of the oldest Greek tribes in Greece and it was probably part of, or a relative tribe of, the aboriginal inhabitants of Greece, who are mentioned by the ancient authors as Pelasgians. Whilst Herodotus seems to have found the idea that the Arcadians were not Greek far-fetched, it is clear that the Arcadians were considered as the original inhabitants of the region. This is testified by ancient myths, like the myth of Arcas, the myth of Lycaon etc.

Arcadia is also one of the regions described in the "Catalogue of Ships" in the Iliad. Agamemnon himself gave Arcadia the ships for the Trojan war because Arcadia did not have a navy.

Language

Due to its remote, mountainous character, Arcadia seems to have been a cultural refuge. During the Mycenaean Era (c. 1600 BC – 1200 BC), the Greek dialect of the region was likely Mycenaean. When, during the Greek Dark Age (c. 1200 BC – 800 BC), Doric Greek dialects were introduced to the Peloponnese, the older language apparently survived in Arcadia, and formed part of the Arcado-Cypriot group of Greek dialects. Arcadocypriot never became a literary dialect, but it is known from inscriptions. Tsan is a letter of the Greek alphabet occurring only in Arcadia, shaped like Cyrillic И; it represents an affricate that developed from labiovelars in context where they became t in other dialects.

Towns
The Arcadians founded numerous towns. Of these the strongest were the cities which controlled the few fertile valleys; Mantinea, Tegea and Orchomenos. The remaining towns were more mountainous or had smaller plains. Some of these were Asea, Ypsounta, Teuthis, Heraea, Thyraion, Nestani, Alea, Lykosoura, Trikolonon, Tropea, Caphyae, Pallantion, Petrosaca, Feneos, Phoezon, Leucasium, etc. From 370 BC the capital of Arcadia became Megalopolis.

Religion 

Arcadia was the location of the cult of Despoina, also known as the Arcadian mysteries. Despoina means "the mistress", but was only a title given to the goddess, and was not her real name, which was told only to those initiated in the mysteries. Despoina, along with Demeter, was the primary deity worshipped in Arcadia, and was particularly worshipped at a sanctuary at Lycosura.

The Arcadians had their own unique myths, which were mainly centered around Despoina and Demeter. Another important god in Arcadia was Antyos, who was said to be a Titan who raised Despoina.

Notable Arcadians
Polybius (app. 200–118 BC), Greek historian of the Hellenistic Period (Megalopolis)
Philopoemen (253–183 BC), Greek general and statesman, Achaean strategos, known as "the last of the Greeks"

Olympic victors

Androsthenes of Maenalus, won gold in 420 and 416 BC
Euthymenes of Maenalus, won gold in 400 and 392 BC

Mythology
 Atalanta, a Greek mythic woman said to have been the daughter of the King of Arcadia
 Evander, son of Hermes and an Arcadian nymph called Themis. He was the founder of Pallantium. Pallantium became one of the cities that was merged later into the ancient Rome.
 Hermes, god of gymnasium, public speaking, thievery
 Pan, god of the wild, shepherds and flocks, nature of mountain wilds, hunting and rustic music, and companion of the nymphs
 Themis, a local nymph, lover of Hermes and mother of Evander. Romans called her Carmenta.
Arcas, a mythological king of Arcadia, from which the region takes its name
Lycaon, a king of Arcadia turned into a wolf. He had fifty sons, many of which gave their names to various towns in the region.
Callisto, daughter of Lycaon and follower of the goddess Artemis. She was turned into a bear and shot, becoming the constellation Ursa Major.

See also
 Elysium

Notes

References 

 Dionysius of Halicarnassus. Antiquitatum Romanarum quae supersunt, Vol I-IV, translated by Karl Jacoby. In Aedibus B.G. Teubneri. Leipzig, 1885. Online version at the Perseus Digital Library.
 Herodotus, Histories, A. D. Godley (translator), Cambridge, Massachusetts: Harvard University Press, 1920; . Online version at the Perseus Digital Library.
 Homer, The Iliad with an English Translation by A.T. Murray, Ph.D. in two volumes. Cambridge, Massachusetts, Harvard University Press; London, William Heinemann, Ltd. 1924. Online version at the Perseus Digital Library.
 Ovid, Metamorphoses, Brookes More, Boston, Cornhill Publishing Co. 1922. Online version at the Perseus Digital Library.
Pausanias, Pausanias Description of Greece with an English Translation by W.H.S. Jones, Litt.D., and H.A. Ormerod, M.A., in 4 Volumes. Cambridge, Massachusetts, Harvard University Press; London, William Heinemann Ltd. 1918. Online version at the Perseus Digital Library.
Strabo,  Geography, Editors, H.C. Hamilton, Esq., W. Falconer, M.A., London. George Bell & Sons. 1903. Online version at the Perseus Digital Library

Pan (god)